Donnell Baker (December 21, 1973 - February 5, 2020) is a former American football wide receiver who played for the Carolina Panthers and St. Louis Rams of the National Football League. He played college football at Southern University.

Professional career

Carolina Panthers
Baker was selected by the Carolina Panthers with the 217th pick in the 1996 NFL Draft. He was released by the Panthers on August 25, 1996.

St. Louis Rams
Baker was a member of the St. Louis Rams from 1996 to 1998. He was released by the Rams on August 24, 1998.

References

1973 births
2020 deaths
American football wide receivers
Southern Jaguars football players
Carolina Panthers players
Place of birth missing